Metopistis is a genus of moths of the family Noctuidae. The genus was described by Warren in 1913.

Species
 Metopistis erschoffi Christoph, 1885
 Metopistis picturata Rothschild, 1909

References

Calpinae